These are the results for the men's individual trampoline competition, one of two events of the trampoline discipline contested in the gymnastics at the 2000 Summer Olympics.

Results

Qualification
Twelve entrants competed in the qualifying round. The top eight would go on to the final round.

Final

References

https://web.archive.org/web/20120712191818/http://www.la84foundation.org/5va/reports.htm

Men's trampoline
2000 Men's
Men's events at the 2000 Summer Olympics